Eupithecia lactevirens is a moth in the  family Geometridae. It is found in Argentina.

References

Moths described in 1908
lactevirens
Moths of South America